The Wake is a Big Finish Productions audio drama featuring Lisa Bowerman as Bernice Summerfield, a character from the spin-off media based on the long-running British science fiction television series Doctor Who.

Plot 
Benny looks back on her life, following the devastating events of The End of the World

Cast
Bernice Summerfield - Lisa Bowerman
Bodie - Rex Duis
Peter Summerfield - Thomas Grant
Adrian Wall - Harry Myers
Braxiatel - Miles Richardson
Doggles -Sam Stevens
Joseph - Steven Wickham
Hass - Paul Wolfe

Trivia
This audio dramatises a number of important scenes from Bernice and Braxiatel's relationship going back to the Virgin New Adventures novels; their first meeting in Theatre of War, their conversation at Bernice and Jason's wedding in Happy Endings and the final scene of Tears of the Oracle.

External links
Big Finish Productions - Professor Bernice Summerfield: The Wake

Bernice Summerfield audio plays
Fiction set in the 27th century